Fredrick Vieche was a politician from the U.S. state of Indiana. Between 1880 and 1881 he served as acting Lieutenant Governor of Indiana.

Life
Frederick W. Viehe was born on September 2, 1832 in Westphalia, Prussia and emigrated with his father to the United States in 1845; they settled in the wilderness about 20 miles from Vincennes, Indiana.  He attended Wittenberg Academy (now Wittenberg University) in Springfield, Ohio for 2 years.  While at Witteberg, he worked odd jobs and was a geometry and algebra tutor at Greenway High School.  After obtaining a $125.00 load from an educational fund, he moved to Noblesville, Indiana and read law under Judge David Moss.  After running out of money, he returned to Knox County.  Using money he saved, Viehe purchased a copy of Kent's Commentaries to further his legal education, all the while teaching school.  He was admitted to the practice of law in Indiana in 1859.

He married the former Lizzie W. Sage, the daughter of Col. Sage of Bridgeport, Illinois, in 1872 and from this union were born three children - May, John and Fred.

He joined the Democratic Party and was elected as City Attorney in Vincennes, serving from 1869-1871, and then as Prosecuting Attorney for the 12th Judicial Circuit (1870).  His first run at state-level office was as an independent candidate for the Indiana House of Representatives, and the election ended in a tie.  This outcome necessitated a special runoff election which Viehe lost to the Democratic nominee Charles E. Crane.  His second run was more fruitful, and he was elected to the Indiana House of Representatives in 1876 as a Democrat, representing Knox County.  After serving a single term, Viehe was elected to the Indiana Senate in 1878 and 1880, representing Knox and Sullivan Counties, where he became the President Pro Tempore. In November 1880, Governor James D. Williams died and his Lieutenant Governor Isaac P. Gray followed him as new Governor of Indiana. According to the state constitution the now vacant position of the Lieutenant Governor was filled by the President Pro Tempore of the State Senate, Frederick Viehe. He served in this position between 20 November 1880 and 8 January 1881 when his term ended.

In his post-legislative career, Viehe returned to the practice of law, as well as serving on various civic, political and governmental boards.  He served as a Special Judge in the Circuit Court of Knox County, and was a City Councillor in Vincennes from 1886-1888.  The month of his death in late-1888, Judge Viehe, as he was known, switched political affiliation from the Democratic Party to the Republican Party.  This was the election where fellow Hoosier politician and favorite son Benjamin Harrison was elevated the Presidency.

Frederick W. Viehe died suddenly at his home on November 27, 1888 from a suspected accidental dose ammonia.  He was 56 years old and was interred at Greenlawn Cemetery in Vincennes.

References

External links
 The Political Graveyard
 Find-A-Grave Memorial 

1832 births
1888 deaths
Democratic Party Indiana state senators
Lieutenant Governors of Indiana
19th-century American politicians